Culture Summit Abu Dhabi is the world’s first high-level summit that convenes leaders from the worlds of the arts, media, public policy, and technology. The mission of the conference is to identify ways that culture can raise awareness, build bridges, and promote positive change. 

It is organized and produced by The Rothkopf Group (TRG) and The Canales Project Ventures (TCPV) along with Abu Dhabi Department of Culture & Tourism.

Culture Summit 2018 took place at Saadiyat Island, Abu Dhabi, UAE throughout April 8-12, 2018, and was focused on the theme of “Unexpected Collaborations.” The event featured a series of curated performances, exhibits, and interventions by renowned artists and musicians across the world. The performances came from everywhere from European Union Youth Orchestra to Abu Dhabi’s Bait Al Oud musical academy, with new collaborations transcending disciplinary and cultural boundaries. 

“We are looking for the 2018 event to build on the success of the first inaugural summit,” said HE Noura Al Kaabi, “We expect to generate concrete efforts and tangible results in identifying ways to enhance and support arts education worldwide by connecting with sectors that may not seem quite so relevant to supporting culture, or contributing to public awareness. We believe that the concept of culture is broad and all-inclusive, and endures great potentials to impact people’s lives.” Talks featured such speakers as the Solomon R. Guggenheim Museum’s Artistic Director Nancy Spector; Touria el Glaoui, Founder, 1:54 Contemporary African Art Fair, and Nobel Peace Laureate Kailash Satyarthi.

Organization 
The Summit was planned with an intention of being the "Davos of culture" and a place "to highlight the power of collective imagination as a force for good."

Participants 
The 2017 inaugural event was attended by 450 delegates from 80 countries, including internationally acclaimed visual artist Idris Khan, Academy Award-winning composer and conductor Tan Dun, former United States Secretary of State Madeleine Albright, MacArthur Fellow and award-winning choreographer Liz Lerman, His Excellency Dr. Anwar Gargash, UAE Minister of State for Foreign Affairs, and His Excellency Dr. Zaki Anwar Nusseibeh, UAE Assistant Minister of Foreign Affairs and International Cooperation. It was, however, criticized for excluding a lot of local Emirati artists. CultureSummit 2017 hosted representatives from the following organizations:

 Abu Dhabi Music & Arts Foundation
 Arab Fund for Arts and Culture
 Bahrain Authority on Culture and Antiquities
 China National Symphony Orchestra
 Culture Connect
 El Sistema
 Ford Foundation
Found Sound Nation
 International Music Council
 John F. Kennedy Center for the Performing Arts
 New York University Abu Dhabi Arts Center
 Sesame Workshop
 Solomon R. Guggenheim Foundation
 Art Basel/Tate Modern
 UNESCO
 Vienna Boys' Choir
 Weill Center for Music, Carnegie Hall
 West–Eastern Divan Orchestra

References

External links 
 Culture Summit Abu Dhabi website

Culture in Abu Dhabi
2017 in the United Arab Emirates